The University Laboratory for Small Satellites and Space Engineering Systems (abbreviated and stylized as ULyS3ES) is a space research complex of two buildings.

History
ULyS3ES was joint project of the University of the Philippines Diliman and the Department of Science and Technology Advanced Science and Technology Institute (DOST-ASTI). At that time, the facility was meant to augment the PHL-Microsat program which was later succeeded by the Space Technology and Applications Mastery, Innovation and Advancement (STAMINA4Space) Program as well as to encourage people to take up a career in space technology. It opened on August 31, 2019.

Facilities
ULyS3ES consists of two buildings designated as ULyS3ES-1 and ULyS3ES-2which hosts equipment and facilities that would allow the designing and development of small satellites and the testing and implementation of satellite bus and payload systems. It hosts a full anechoic chamber (FAC) to aid in measuring antenna radiation patterns and hasten the development of satellite communication systems. It also has a separate temperature and humidity test chamber.

References

2019 establishments in the Philippines
Space program of the Philippines
Research institutes in Metro Manila
University and college laboratories in the Philippines